Gordon Ashby Kirkland (July 26, 1904 – June 23, 1953) was an American football, basketball, and baseball coach and college athletics administrator. He served as the head football coach at Catawba College in Salisbury, North Carolina from 1934 to 1948, compiling a record of 106–32–7. Kirkland also had two stints as the head basketball coach at Catawba, from 1934 to 1936 and 1942 to 1945, tallying a mark of 60–37, and was the school's head baseball coach from 1934 to 1948, amassing a record of 179–70–3. He led the Catawba Indians football team to six North State Conference titles and consecutive bowl game victories, in the 1947 and the 1948 Tangerine Bowls.

A native of Durham, North Carolina, Kirkland was a graduate of Elon College. He was the athletic director and head coach at Oxford High School in Oxford, North Carolina, where he led the football team to the finals of the North Carolina class B state championship in 1929. Kirkland was hired in 1930 as the athletic director and head coach at Salisbury High School in Salisbury, North Carolina. In 1934, he was appointed athletic director and head coach of all major sports at Catawba.

Kirkland died on June 23, 1953, at his home in Salisbury, following two weeks of serious illness and several years of declining heath due to a heart and kidney condition.
He is a member of the Catawba College Hall of Fame, the Salisbury Athletic Hall of Fame, and North Carolina Sports Hall of Fame.

Head coaching record

Football

References

External links
 

1904 births
1953 deaths
Catawba Indians athletic directors
Catawba Indians baseball coaches
Catawba Indians football coaches
Catawba Indians men's basketball coaches
High school football coaches in North Carolina
Elon University alumni
Sportspeople from Durham, North Carolina
Coaches of American football from North Carolina
Baseball coaches from North Carolina
Basketball coaches from North Carolina